The Nobel Prizes are awarded annually by the Royal Swedish Academy of Sciences, the Swedish Academy, the Karolinska Institutet, and the Norwegian Nobel Committee to individuals and organizations who make outstanding contributions in the fields of chemistry, physics, literature, peace, and physiology or medicine. They were established by the 1895 will of Alfred Nobel, which dictates that the awards should be administered by the Nobel Foundation. An additional prize in memory of Alfred Nobel was established in 1968 by the Sveriges Riksbank (Sweden’s central bank) for outstanding contributions to the field of economics. Each recipient, a Nobelist or laureate, receives a gold medal, a diploma, and a sum of money which is decided annually by the Nobel Foundation.

Prize
Each prize is awarded by a separate committee; the Royal Swedish Academy of Sciences awards the Prizes in Physics, Chemistry, and Economics; the Karolinska Institute awards the Prize in Physiology or Medicine; and the Norwegian Nobel Committee awards the Prize in Peace. Each recipient receives a medal, a diploma and a monetary award that has varied throughout the years. In 1901, the recipients of the first Nobel Prizes were given 150,782 SEK, which is equal to 8,402,670 SEK in December 2017. In 2017, the laureates were awarded a prize amount of 9,000,000 SEK. The awards are presented in Stockholm in an annual ceremony on December 10, the anniversary of Nobel's death.

In years in which the Nobel Prize is not awarded due to external events or a lack of nominations, the prize money is returned to the funds delegated to the relevant prize. The Nobel Prize was not awarded between 1940 and 1942 due to the outbreak of World War II.

Laureates
Between 1901 and 2017, the Nobel Prizes and the Nobel Memorial Prize in Economic Sciences were awarded 585 times to 923 people and organizations. With some receiving the Nobel Prize more than once, this makes a total of 892 individuals (including 844 men, 48 women) and 24 organizations. Six Nobel laureates were not permitted by their governments to accept the Nobel Prize. Adolf Hitler forbade four Germans, Richard Kuhn (Chemistry, 1938), Adolf Butenandt (Chemistry, 1939), Gerhard Domagk (Physiology or Medicine, 1939) and Carl von Ossietzky (Peace, 1936) from accepting their Nobel Prizes. The Chinese government forbade Liu Xiaobo from accepting his Nobel Prize (Peace, 2010) and the government of the Soviet Union pressured Boris Pasternak (Literature, 1958) to decline his award. Liu Xiaobo, Carl von Ossietzky and Aung San Suu Kyi were all awarded their Nobel Prize while in prison or detention. Two Nobel laureates, Jean-Paul Sartre (Literature, 1964) and Lê Ðức Thọ (Peace, 1973), declined the award; Sartre declined the award as he declined all official honors, and Thọ declined the award due to the situation Vietnam was in at the time.

Seven laureates have received more than one prize; of the seven, the International Committee of the Red Cross has received the Nobel Peace Prize three times, more than any other. UNHCR has been awarded the Nobel Peace Prize twice. Also the Nobel Prize in Physics was awarded to John Bardeen twice, as was the Nobel Prize in Chemistry to Frederick Sanger and Karl Barry Sharpless. Two laureates have been awarded twice but not in the same field: Marie Curie (Physics and Chemistry) and Linus Pauling (Chemistry and Peace). Among the 892 Nobel laureates, 48 have been women; the first woman to receive a Nobel Prize was Marie Curie, who received the Nobel Prize in Physics in 1903. She was also the first person (male or female) to be awarded two Nobel Prizes, the second award being the Nobel Prize in Chemistry, given in 1911.

List of laureates

50 year secrecy rule 
The Committee neither informs the media nor the candidates themselves of the names of the nominees. Insofar as specific names frequently appear in the early predictions of who will receive the award in any given year, this is either pure speculation or inside information from the person or people who submitted the nomination. After fifty years, the database of nominations maintained by the Nobel Committee is made available to the public. Statutes of the Nobel Foundation, § 10, states:A prize-awarding body may, however, after due consideration in each individual case, permit access to material which formed the basis for the evaluation and decision concerning a prize, for purposes of research in intellectual history. Such permission may not, however, be granted until at least 50 years have elapsed after the date on which the decision in question was made.

See also 

List of Nobel laureates by country
List of female Nobel laureates
List of nominees for the Nobel Prize in Literature
List of nominees for the Nobel Prize in Chemistry
List of nominees for the Nobel Prize in Physics
List of female nominees for the Nobel Prize
List of individuals nominated for the Nobel Peace Prize
List of organizations nominated for the Nobel Peace Prize

Notes

References
General

 
 
 
 
 
 

Specific

External links

 Official website of the Royal Swedish Academy of Sciences
 Official website of the Nobel Foundation
 Downloadable Database of Nobel Laureates